The following Confederate Army units and commanders fought in the Battle of Piedmont of the American Civil War. The Union order of battle is listed separately.

Abbreviations used

Military rank
 MG = Major General
 BG = Brigadier General
 Col = Colonel
 Ltc = Lieutenant Colonel
 Maj = Major
 Cpt = Captain

Confederate States Army of the Valley District

Department of Southwest Virginia and East Tennessee
BG William E. Jones (k)

See also

 Virginia in the American Civil War

References

 Johnson, Robert Underswood & Clarence Clough Buell (eds.).  Battles and Leaders of the Civil War Volume 4 (New York:  The Century Company), 1884.
 Lepa, Jack H. The Shenandoah Valley Campaign of 1864 (Jefferson, NC:  McFarland & Co.), 2003.  
 Patchan, Scott C. Shenandoah Summer:  The 1864 Valley Campaign (Lincoln, NE:  University of Nebraska Press), 2007.  

American Civil War orders of battle